Dreamside is a novel by Graham Joyce.

Dreamside may also refer to:

 The Dreamside, Dutch rock band
 "Dreamside", a song on the 2006 Unreal (End of You album)
 Dreamside kingdoms in the webcomic Cucumber Quest